The 2009 Summer Tour was the fifth concert tour by American rock group No Doubt.

Background

On December 3, 2008, the band announced on their official website plans of a tour and a new album . They stated, "As most of you saw from our little iChat (yes, it was really us), we have decided to go on tour next year while continuing to work on our album.  We are working on tour dates now and can't wait to get out there and play for all of you – it's been too long!  We'll announce tour dates soon so be sure to check back for updates.  Have a safe and happy holiday and we'll see you on the road in 2009!" The tour was officially announced in January 2009 by MTV News. Stefani cited the reason for tour was to perform their favorite songs and explore new musical directions. A survey on the band's website complied fan's favorite songs that have a possibility of being performed on the tour. During an interview with guitarist Tom Dumont, he explained the tour will have A Clockwork Orange theme, saying, "Gwen came up with the Clockwork Orange thing—she started getting into the visuals of those modernist movies from the 60's. We've been looking at tons of art and it's like this space-age modernism from that decade—it's retro and modern at the same time, so we're building this crazy stage set that has that vibe. We have a bunch of really great artists doing t-shirts and posters that echo that. There's a whole look for the tour even though there's not an album yet."It was also revealed that the group will give away their entire music catalog (in digital format) to spectators  who purchased high level tickets. The group appeared on The Today Show, American Idol, The Ellen DeGeneres Show, Jimmy Kimmel Live! and Gossip Girl to promote the tour. This tour should not be considered a reunion tour, because No Doubt stated it is not a reunion since the band had never broken up.

Opening acts
Paramore (select dates)
The Sounds (select dates)
Bedouin Soundclash (select dates)
Janelle Monáe (select dates)
Tinted Windows (select dates)
Katy Perry (August 4)
Panic! at the Disco (select dates)
Matt Costa (select dates)

Setlist

"Spiderwebs"
"Hella Good"
"Underneath It All"
"Excuse Me Mr."
"Ex-Girlfriend"
"End It On This"
"Tragic Kingdom"
"Squeal"
"Simple Kind of Life"
"Bathwater"
"Guns of Navarone" 
"New"
"Hey Baby"
"Running"
"Magic's In The Makeup"
"Different People"
"Total Hate"
"Don't Speak"
"It's My Life"
"Just a Girl"
Encore
"Rock Steady"
"Stand and Deliver" 
"Sunday Morning"

Tour dates

a This concert is a part of the Bamboozle Festival
b This concert is a part of Tiger Jam XII 
c This concert is a part of Summerfest

Box office score data

References

External links

 Official site

2009 concert tours
No Doubt concert tours
Paramore concert tours